Fritz Schwarz (born August 14, 1899, date of death unknown) was a German bobsledder who competed in the 1930s. He won two medals at the 1934 FIBT World Championships with a gold in the four-man and a silver in the two-man event.

Schwarz also finished seventh in the four-man event at the 1936 Winter Olympics in Garmisch-Partenkirchen.

References
Bobsleigh two-man world championship medalists since 1931
Bobsleigh four-man world championship medalists since 1930
Wallenchinsky, David. (1984). "Bobsled". In The Complete Book the Olympics: 1896-1980. New York: Penguin Books. p. 560.

1899 births
German male bobsledders
Olympic bobsledders of Germany
Bobsledders at the 1936 Winter Olympics
Year of death missing